Maria Elisabeth of Schleswig-Holstein-Gottorp (6 June 1634, in Gottorp Castle – 17 June 1665, in Darmstadt), was by marriage landgravine of Hesse-Darmstadt

Life 
Mary Elizabeth was a daughter of the Frederick III of Schleswig-Holstein-Gottorp (1597–1659) from his marriage to Duchess Marie Elisabeth of Saxony (1610–1684), a daughter of John George I, Elector of Saxony.

She married on 24 November 1650 at Gottorp Castle, Louis, who later became Louis VI, Landgrave of Hesse-Darmstadt (1630–1678), whom she had engaged on his birthday in 1649. On the occasion of the wedding, the last sword dance in Hesse was performed at a festival in Lollar.

His father drew Louis into the government business in the year after their marriage in 1651. Louis succeeded his father in 1661. Louis tied extensive political relations with Sweden via Maria Elizabeth's sister Hedvig Eleonora, Queen of Sweden. Marie Elisabeth had eight children; she died in 1665 in child birth. Her death plunged Louis into deep mourning.  He wrote some poems in memory of his wife.

Offspring 
From her marriage, Marie Elisabeth had the following children:
 Magdalena Sybille (1652–1712)
 married in 1673 Duke William Louis of Württemberg (1647–1677)
 Sophie Eleonore (born and died 1653)
 George (1654–1655)
 Marie Elisabeth (1656–1715)
 married in 1676 Duke Henry of Saxe-Römhild (1650–1710)
 Auguste Magdalene (1657–1674)
 Louis VII (1658–1678), Landgrave of Hesse-Darmstadt
 Frederick (1659–1676)
 Marie Sophie (1661–1712)
 married in 1681 Duke Christian of Saxe-Eisenberg (1653–1707)

Sources 
 Heinrich Zehfu: antiquity of the royal capital Darmstadt, p. 60 (in German)
 magazine for German cultural history, p. 345 (in German)
 Georg Friedrich Teuthorn: extensive history of Hesse, p. 582 (in German)
 

 

  

1634 births
1665 deaths
People from Schleswig, Schleswig-Holstein
House of Holstein-Gottorp
Deaths in childbirth
Daughters of monarchs